Dejan Uzelac (born 27 August 1993) is a Serbian professional footballer who plays as a defender for Bosnian Premier League club Borac Banja Luka.

Club career
Born in Zrenjanin, Uzelac started his career with local club Banat, where he made his senior debut in last fixture of the 2010–11 Serbian First League season, against Mladi Radnik.

He was also loaned to Zadrugar Lazarevo for the 2011–12 Serbian League Vojvodina season. Returning to his home club, Uzelac was also used two times for the 2012–13 season. After he spent a season with Proleter Novi Sad, Uzelac joined Bosnian Premier League side Drina Zvornik in the summer of 2014.

At the beginning of February 2015, he signed a two year contract with Željezničar, but a year later he moved to other club from the same city, Olimpik. In the summer of 2016, Uzelac joined Metalac Gornji Milanovac. At the beginning of 2017, he returned to Olimpik. He left Olimpik in June 2017.

In January 2018, Uzelac again came back to Olimpik. On 15 July 2019, he signed with Sloboda Tuzla. Uzelac made his debut for Sloboda on 21 July 2019, in a 2–1 home league win against Radnik Bijeljina. He scored his first goal for Sloboda in a 2–1 away league loss against Borac Banja Luka on 8 December 2019.

On 20 January 2021, Uzelac signed a one-and-a-half-year contract with Borac Banja Luka. He debuted in a league game against Velež Mostar on 5 March 2021. Uzelac scored his first goal for Borac in a league game against his former Olimpik on 11 April 2021. He won his first trophy with Borac on 23 May 2021, getting crowned Bosnian Premier League champions one game before the end of the 2020–21 season.

Honours
Borac Banja Luka
Bosnian Premier League: 2020–21

References

External links

1993 births
Living people
Sportspeople from Zrenjanin
Serbian footballers
Serbian expatriate footballers
Expatriate footballers in Bosnia and Herzegovina
Serbian First League players
Premier League of Bosnia and Herzegovina players
Serbian SuperLiga players
First League of the Federation of Bosnia and Herzegovina players
FK Banat Zrenjanin players
FK Proleter Novi Sad players
FK Drina Zvornik players
FK Željezničar Sarajevo players
FK Olimpik players
FK Metalac Gornji Milanovac players
FK Sloboda Tuzla players
FK Borac Banja Luka players
Association football defenders